Isador Simon "Sid" Phillips (14 June 1907 – 23 May 1973) was an English jazz clarinettist, bandleader, and arranger.

Early life and education
Phillips was born in London, England, into a Jewish family. He learned violin and piano as a child, and played reeds in his teens as a member of his brother's European band. He got into the music business as a publisher and director for the Edison Bell.

Career
In 1930, Phillips began writing arrangements for Bert Ambrose, and joined Ambrose's ensemble in 1933, remaining there until 1937. Later in the 1930s, Phillips played in the United States on radio and freelance in clubs. He served in the Royal Air Force during World War II, then put together his own quartet in 1946 and wrote several pieces for the BBC Symphony Orchestra. He led a Dixieland jazz band of his own formation from 1949, and his sidemen variously included George Shearing, Colin Bailey, Tommy Whittle, and Kenny Ball.

Phillips's first recordings under his own name were made in 1928, and he continued to record as a leader into the 1970s.

In 1937 through 1938, a number of his recordings were issued in the United States, through a contract he signed with Irving Mills and issued on Mills' Variety label, as well as Vocalion, Brunswick and Columbia labels, most recordings were made in England.

In popular culture
One of Phillips' songs, "Boogie Man", is included in the 2008 video game Fallout 3 and the 2016 television series Stranger Things.

His rendition of the song Heartaches was sampled in the opening track of The Caretaker's final project Everywhere at the End of Time.

Personal life
Phillips died in Chertsey, Surrey, in 1973, aged 65.

Phillips' son, Simon Phillips, is a drummer, and started his career in the big band of his father.

References

Nevil Skrimshire, "Sid Phillips". Grove Jazz online.

External links

 "Sid Phillips Vinyl Records and Music Sample". Classical33.co.uk

1907 births
1973 deaths
British jazz bandleaders
British jazz clarinetists
Musicians from London
20th-century English musicians
Royal Air Force personnel of World War II
Tempo Records (US) artists